Branko Popović may refer to:

Branko Popović (painter) (1882–1944)
Branko Popović (politician) (born 1975)